Louis Boyer (1901–1999) was a French astronomer who worked at the Algiers Observatory, North Africa, where he discovered 40 asteroids between 1930 and 1952.

In the 1950s and 1960s. he worked on identifications of small Solar System bodies at Nice Observatory in southeastern France. The asteroid 1215 Boyer, discovered by his colleague Alfred Schmitt at Algiers in 1932, was named after him. In turn Boyer named the 1617 Alschmitt asteroid in honor of Schmitt.

Boyer also named 1713 Bancilhon after Odette Bancilhon his colleague and wife of astronomer Alfred Schmitt.

References 
 

20th-century French astronomers

1901 births
1999 deaths
Discoverers of asteroids
Recipients of the Lalande Prize